Bulk cargo is commodity cargo that is transported unpackaged in large quantities.

Description 

Bulk cargo refers to material in either liquid or granular, particulate form, as a mass of relatively small solids, such as petroleum/crude oil, grain, coal, or gravel. This cargo is usually dropped or poured, with a spout or shovel bucket, into a bulk carrier ship's hold, railroad car/railway wagon, or tanker truck/trailer/semi-trailer body. Smaller quantities can be boxed (or drummed) and palletised; cargo packaged in this manner is referred to as breakbulk cargo. Bulk cargo is classified as wet or dry.

The Baltic Exchange is based in London and provides a range of indices benchmarking the cost of moving bulk commodities, dry and wet, along popular routes around the seas. Some of these indices are also used to settle Freight Futures, known as FFA's. The most famous of the Baltic indices is the Baltic Dry Indices, commonly called the BDI. This is a derived function of the Baltic Capesize index (BCI), Baltic Panamax index (BPI), Baltic Supramax index (BSI) and the Baltic Handysize index (BHSI). The BDI has been used as a bellwether for the global economy as it can be interpreted as an indicator of an increase or decrease in the amount of raw commodities countries are importing/exporting.

Dry 
Dry bulk is any cargo carried in bulk in solid form. Such carriage is often referred to as the "dry" trades. They would include:

 Bauxite
 Bulk minerals (sand, gravel, copper, limestone, salt)
 Cements
 Chemicals (fertilizer, plastic granules and pellets, resin powder, synthetic fiber)
 Coals and cokes
 Agricultural products such as dry edibles (for animals or humans: alfalfa pellets, citrus pellets, livestock feed, flour, peanuts, raw or refined sugar, seeds or starches.)
 Grains (wheat, maize, rice, barley, oats, rye, sorghum, soybeans, etc.)
 Iron (ferrous and non-ferrous ores, ferroalloys, pig iron, scrap metal, pelletized taconite)
 Wood chips

Wet 
Liquid bulk cargo includes any cargo carried in closed tanks and poured or pumped into the carrying vessel, such as:

 Hazardous chemicals in liquid form
 Petroleum
 Gasoline
 Liquefied natural gas (LNG)
 Liquid nitrogen
 Cooking oil
 Fruit juices
 Rubber
 Vegetable oil

Gallery

Specialized large ports

 Port of Port Hedland, Australia
 Port of Rotterdam
 Port of Vancouver
 Port of Liverpool
 Port of Tyne
 Port of Amsterdam
 Port of Hamilton (Canada)

See also

 Bulk material handling
 Covered hopper
 Flexible intermediate bulk container (bigbag)
 Harmonized System
 Hopper car
 Lake freighter
 Loading gauge
 Maritime transport
 Milk tank car
 Neo-bulk cargo
 Rotary car dumper
 Selfdischarger
 Tank car
 Tank truck
 World's busiest port

Bibliography

References

Bulk material handling